Hannah C. Cobb   is an archaeologist at the University of Manchester, noted for her work on pedagogy, post-humanist theory, and diversity and equality in archaeology.

Education
Cobb undertook her PhD research at the University of Manchester, completed in 2008.

Career and research
Cobb is a Professor of Archaeology and Pedagogy at the University of Manchester. Her research focuses on the Mesolithic archaeology of north-west Europe, archaeological pedagogy, and equality and diversity in archaeology. Cobb has co-edited several monographs, including Investigating the Role of Fieldwork in Teaching and Learning Archaeology and Reconsidering Archaeological Fieldwork. Her work on archaeological pedagogy is strongly influenced by Manuel DeLanda and assemblage theory.

Cobb was the Founder and chair of the Chartered Institute for Archaeologists (CIFA) Equality & Diversity Group (2015-2021), and founded the EveryDigSexism Project. She also co-directs the Whitworth Park Community Archaeology and History project.

Selected publications
Her publications include:
Cobb, H et al. 2005. (ed.) Investigating prehistoric hunter-gatherer identities: case studies from Palaeolithic and Mesolithic Europe. Oxford: Archaeopress.
Cobb, H. 2005. Straight down the line? A queer consideration of hunter-gatherer studies in north-west Europe. World Archaeology 37(4), 630–636.
Cobb, H.L. 2007. Media for Movement and Making the World: Exploring Materiality and Identity in the Mesolithic of the Northern Irish Sea Basin. Internet Archaeology 22. Mesolithic Archaeology Theme. 
Croucher, Karina, Hannah L. Cobb, and Ange Brennan. 2008. Investigating the role of fieldwork in teaching and learning archaeology. Higher Education Academy, Subject Centre for History, Classics and Archaeology.
Cobb, H., Harris, O. J., Jones, C., & Richardson, P. (eds). 2012. Reconsidering archaeological fieldwork: exploring on-site relationships between theory and practice. Springer Science & Business Media.
Cobb, H., & Croucher, K. 2014. Assembling archaeological pedagogy. A theoretical framework for valuing pedagogy in archaeological interpretation and practice. Archaeological Dialogues 21(2): 197–216.
Cobb, H., & Croucher, K. 2016. Personal, political, pedagogic: challenging the binary bind in archaeological teaching, learning and fieldwork. Journal of Archaeological Method and Theory 23(3): 949–969.

Awards and honours
Cobb was awarded a National Teaching Fellowship from Advance HE in 2022. She is also a member of the Chartered Institute for Archaeologists (MCIfA) and a Senior Fellow of the Higher Education Academy (SFHEA). She was elected as a Fellow of the Society of Antiquaries in 2016. The Ardnamurchan Transitions Project, which Cobb co-directs, was awarded the 2014 Archaeology Training Forum (ATF) Training Award.

References 

Living people
Year of birth missing (living people)
Fellows of the Society of Antiquaries of London
Academics of the University of Manchester
British women archaeologists
Fellows of the Society of Antiquaries of Scotland
Senior Fellows of the Higher Education Academy